The 2001–02 San Jose Sharks season was the club's 11th season of operation in the National Hockey League (NHL). The Sharks once again set franchise records for points (99) and wins (44) in a season. Most notably, the team won the Pacific Division for the first time in franchise history. Consequently, the Sharks clinched a playoff berth for the fifth consecutive season.

In Darryl Sutter's fifth year as head coach, the Sharks took a massive step forward. For the first time, the team boasted offensive depth in spades, as six forwards (Owen Nolan, Teemu Selanne, Patrick Marleau, Marco Sturm, Scott Thornton and Vincent Damphousse) finished the season with at least 20 goals, while another two (Mike Ricci and Adam Graves) finished with at least 17. While the Sharks' defense nominally regressed from one year earlier, it remained one of the Western Conference's top units; the play of Brad Stuart, Bryan Marchment, Gary Suter and Mike Rathje proved more than adequate during the regular season. The Sharks also benefited from the strong goaltending of starter Evgeni Nabokov and backup Miikka Kiprusoff. Regular season highlights included a 10–2 victory over the Columbus Blue Jackets (March 30, 2002) and Patrick Marleau's first career hat trick (April 6, 2002). Evgeni Nabokov also became the first goaltender in franchise history (and seventh in NHL history) to score a goal with an empty-net tally against the Vancouver Canucks on March 10. On April 12, the Sharks clinched the Pacific Division title following a Los Angeles Kings loss to the Canucks. In winning the division, the Sharks also clinched home-ice advantage in a playoff series for the first time in franchise history.

In the first round of the 2002 Stanley Cup playoffs, the third-seeded Sharks faced the sixth-seeded Phoenix Coyotes. The teams split the first two games in San Jose. From there, however, the Sharks closed the series out with a trio of convincing victories. In the second round, the team faced eventual Hall of Fame goaltender Patrick Roy and the defending champion Colorado Avalanche. The Sharks took successive series leads of 1–0, 2–1 and 3–2 against the favored Avalanche. However, each time Colorado managed to re-tie the series. In Game 6, which was briefly interrupted by a magnitude 5.2 earthquake, the Sharks took the Avalanche to overtime. However, a goal by Peter Forsberg forced a deciding seventh game in Denver. There, the Avalanche eliminated the Sharks with a hard-fought 1–0 victory. The game is arguably best remembered (amongst Sharks fans) for Teemu Selanne missing an open net from close range in the first period.

Offseason

Regular season
On March 10, 2002, Evgeni Nabokov became the first netminder in NHL history to score a powerplay goal, doing so against the Vancouver Canucks. He was also the first European goaltender to score a goal.

On March 30, 2002, the Sharks defeated the Columbus Blue Jackets at home 10–2. It was the second time in the 2001–02 NHL regular season that a team had scored ten goals in a single game, as the Ottawa Senators had defeated the Washington Capitals on the road 11–5. Further, it was the first time the Sharks had scored ten goals in a regular season game since January 13, 1996, when they defeated the Pittsburgh Penguins on the road 10–8.

Final standings

Schedule and results

Playoffs

Player statistics

Draft picks

References
 Sharks on Hockey Database

San
San
San Jose Sharks seasons
San Jose Sharks
San Jose Sharks